Vidoje Blagojević (born 22 June 1950) is a former commander of the Bratunac Brigade of the Republika Srpska Army who was charged and tried by the ICTY for his involvement in the Srebrenica massacre.

Career
In January 2005 the International Criminal Tribunal for the Former Yugoslavia found him guilty of engaging in genocide and other war crimes and sentenced him to 18 years in prison. On 9 May the ICTY's appeals court reversed the genocide conviction and reduced his sentence to 15 years in Norway, where he was released early and deported.

A Bosnian Serb, during the course of the Bosnian War, Blagojević rose through the ranks of the Army of Republika Srpska. He participated in the securing and eventual capture of the Srebrenica safe area.
He was captured on 10 August 2001 and soon interred at the Hague Tribunal. Blagojević was tried along with Dragan Jokić and Dragan Obrenović.

Both pleaded not guilty. Blagojević was eventually found guilty of five of his six charges, while he was acquitted of the charge of extermination as a crime against humanity. On 25 January 2008, he was transferred to Norway to serve his prison sentence. On 22 December 2012, he was granted early release.

References

External links
ICTY Amended Joinder Indictment
ICTY Judgement

1950 births
Living people
People from Bratunac
Serbs of Bosnia and Herzegovina convicted of crimes against humanity
Army of Republika Srpska soldiers
People convicted by the International Criminal Tribunal for the former Yugoslavia
People indicted by the International Criminal Tribunal for the former Yugoslavia
Bosnia and Herzegovina people imprisoned abroad
Prisoners and detainees of Norway